Jaime Hernández Méndez (born June 14, 1933) is a retired Brigadier General of the Guatemalan Army who served as the first Minister of Defense of the new Democratic period which started with the free election of President Vinicio Cerezo Arevalo in 1986.  He served from January 14, 1986 to January 31, 1987.

He was part of the High Command of the Army who took charge of the country after the Coup against Efraín Rios Montt in 1983.  At that time he was the First Commander of the key base Guardia de Honor when General Óscar Mejía Victores took charge of the Government.

Together with General Mejía Víctores as Chief of State and Minister of Defense and General Rodolfo Lobos Zamora as Sub Chief of State and Chief of General Staff of National Defense, General Hernández started the process for the return to democracy with elections for a Constituent Assembly in 1984 followed with free general elections in 1985.

References

1933 births
Living people
Guatemalan military personnel
Defense Ministers of Guatemala